Thermally modified wood is wood that has been modified by a controlled pyrolysis process of wood being heated  in absence of oxygen inducing some chemical changes to the chemical structures of cell wall components (lignin, cellulose and hemicellulose) in the wood in order to increase its durability. Low oxygen content prevents the wood from burning at these high temperatures. Several different technologies are introduced using different media including nitrogen gas, steam and hot oil.

Modification processes
The first technological approach of thermal modification processes of wood is the paper of Burmester.

There are five different thermal modification processes: Thermowood (or Premium wood) in Finland, Retification process (Retiwood, New Option Wood) and Les Bois Perdure in France, Plato process in Netherlands, Oil-heat treatment in Germany (OHT-Process), Westwood Process and the AlphaInterloc processes are proprietary process technologies in USA.

Description of the process

Three of the processes are performed in one step, using oil (oil-heat treatment), nitrogen (Reti wood) and steam (Le-Bois Perdure). The Thermo wood process consists of drying, heat treatment and finally cooling/conditioning, and takes up to 72 hours. The Plato process consists of hydrothermolysis, dry curing and conditioning, and can take up to 7 days. The required time depends on wood species, width and initial moisture content.

Westwood Process 
Westwood is the most advanced modern thermo-modification process, patented in 2004. The process has initially developed for treatment hardwoods, which are more complicated compared to softwoods due to thermo-chemical reactions appeared in hardwoods during thermo-treatment. The fully automated Westwood control system allows to manage thermo-treatment of any hardwoods and softwood species.

AlphaInterloc Process
AlphaInterloc process is an advanced thermo-chemical, Exothermic reaction proprietary process pending and Copyright 2022.  This process uses specialized thermo-mechanical process. The AlphaInterloc process is entirely green technology.

Retification
Retification refers to the French word rétification, which is the portmanteau of réticulation (creation of chemical bonds between polymeric chains) and torréfaction (roasting). Wood in this process must have a moisture content at 12% or lower which can be attained through simple drying processes. The wood is then placed in a high nitrogen atmosphere with no more than 2% oxygen content. The Perdure Process is relatively similar to retification but holds the wood at a lower temperature.

ThermoWood 
This process is similar to the Les Bois Perdure treatment in that it uses a steam environment at atmospheric pressure to treat the wood. However, this process can also be used on "green" wood and was the most widely used commercial process as of 2004.

Characteristics of thermally modified wood
The main advantage is that softwood can be used for applications that require high durability, which might be seen as environmentally friendly. Durability class 1–3, according to European Standard EN 350-2, can be obtained out of non durable (class 5) softwood species.

The main disadvantage is that the strength is decreased as a result of the high temperatures. In general the bending strength is reduced up to 30%  with more reduction at higher temperatures.

The biological resistance against some (not all) micro-organisms and insects is improved. However, due to breakdown of volatile organic compounds (VOC) the antimicrobial properties of wood may also decrease.  Shrinking and swelling is reduced up to 50–90%. The treated wood is somewhat darkened in colour.

As a principle the heat treatment process can be done on all wood species.

Maturity of the technology

Thermally modified wood is not just an academic topic these days. Thermal wood treatment has already been penetrating the market for a number of years. There is also some industrial input in the research and development. The Natural Resources Research Institute at the University of Minnesota Duluth has a pilot-scale kiln to research the effectiveness of thermal modification on underutilized Minnesota tree species to expand the wood markets.

In the guitar-making industry, this process is called "Thermo Curing", "Baked" and "Roasted", among other names. Some guitar manufacturers have begun using acoustic sound boards and electric guitar fretboards that are thermally cured in order to help prevent the typical warping and cracking that often occurs from seasonal humidity swings. As a secondary benefit, acoustic guitars tend to sound like well-broken-in aged instruments much sooner than do non-thermally modified guitars.

Main companies in the industry

In the USA the biggest thermo-modification producer is Westwood, which was the first to start thermo-treatment production in USA in 2007. In Europe thermally modified wood production on a commercial scale has been concentrated largely in Estonia.  Estonia is geographically close to the major Finnish producers of thermo-kilns, while labor and overhead costs are lower than in Finland or the Scandinavian countries.  Three major Estonian producers of thermally modified wood emerged in the late 1990s: Brenstol OU, Tre-Timber OU and Ha-Serv.  All 3 companies focused on providing sauna materials for the Finnish market and interior flooring—Brenstol specializing in hardwoods and Tre-Timber specializing in softwoods.  In the early 2000s, Brenstol purchased Tre-Timber, becoming the largest producer of thermally modified wood.

At about that time, the market for thermally modified wood expanded dramatically from its traditional application in sauna materials, to include exterior products, such as decking (terrace) and cladding (siding).  While Ha-Serv continued to focus primarily on the Finnish sauna market, Brenstol established the Thermory brand and begin to export across Europe and to Japan and Thermory has become the most widely-recognized brand of thermally modified wood in these regions. The market for thermally modified exterior products increased very rapidly as European consumers increasingly looked for alternatives to tropical woods from Asia, Africa and South America.  A Turkish producer, Nova Wood, also started producing of thermally modified wood and became a minor player in European markets.

In 2012, Brenstol established an affiliate in the U.S., Thermory USA and began to expand aggressively in markets around the world.  The Thermory brand has become well-established in the U.S. and Canada, and has been shipped to over 55 countries around the world. In 2016, Thermory’s revenue was 29 mln euros, with 1.8 mln euros in profit.

Small, local producers continue to emerge in each region, but there are high barriers to entry into the thermally modified wood market—particularly for thermally modified hardwoods.  The proper thermal modification equipment is extremely expensive.  In addition, because the technology is not well known, there is little public information available about drying schedules, and many new producers of thermally modified woods experience a large % of drying defects, discoloration, brittleness, equipment malfunctions (including fires) and an inability to obtain the high durability ratings that more established producers, like Brenstol (Thermory), have achieved. In 2018, Thermory purchased Ha-Serv, becoming the market leader in the thermally modified wood segment.

The latest research of thermo modification process showed that the coloration of wood during thermo-treatment is not necessary leading to its durability and stability: the reactions which are responsible for changing color during modification are different than reactions which are responsible for durability. Not all brown wood should be considered really thermo-modified. To the time Westwood is the only technology implemented these changes in the thermo-modification process to produce really durable and stabile thermo-modified wood in the industry.

Ongoing research
There is ongoing research to optimize the industrial processes and the various parameters to produce it and to develop the applications for this wood. There is also research in order to find new wood heat treatment processes, even trying to combine different wood modification processes. 

AlphaInterloc is a company that is doing current process engineering and equipment design in USA North America. <ref>

Finally, research is ongoing in an effort to clarify the chemical changes undergone by wood during the thermal treatment process.

See also
  - another process for improving the durability of hardwoods, using chemical rather than thermal means

References

Engineered wood